Thorius troglodytes, commonly known as Taylor's pigmy salamander, is a species of salamander in the family Plethodontidae that is endemic to Mexico. It is found only near the village of Acultzingo (Veracruz) in the northern Sierra Madre de Oaxaca, at elevations of  asl.

Its natural habitats are pine-oak forests (including somewhat degraded forests) where it lives under bark, logs, in wood chips, and under rocks. This formerly very common species has declined. It is threatened by habitat loss caused by logging, livestock farming, and subsistence agriculture.

References

troglodytes
Endemic amphibians of Mexico
Fauna of the Sierra Madre de Oaxaca
Taxonomy articles created by Polbot
Amphibians described in 1941
Taxa named by Edward Harrison Taylor